Henry Thomas "Honolulu" Hughes Jr. (May 4, 1907December 27, 1963) was an American football running back in the National Football League for the Boston Braves.  He played college football at Oregon State University.

External links
Hawaii Sports Hall of Fame Profile

Players of American football from Honolulu
American football running backs
Oregon State Beavers football players
Boston Braves (NFL) players
1963 deaths
1907 births